They Don't Know may refer to:
"They Don't Know" (Kirsty MacColl song), 1979, later a hit for Tracey Ullman
"They Don't Know" (Jon B. song), 1998
They Don't Know (So Solid Crew album), 2001
"They Don't Know" (So Solid Crew song), 2001
"They Don't Know" (Paul Wall song), 2005
"They Don't Know" (Savage song), 2005
"They Don't Know" (Disciples song), 2015
They Don't Know (Jason Aldean album), 2016
"They Don't Know" (Jason Aldean song), 2016
"They Don't Know", a song from the musical Thoroughly Modern Millie
"They Don't Know", a song by Rico Love

See also
They Know (disambiguation)